Emil Max Hödel (27 May 1857 – 16 August 1878) was a plumber from Leipzig, Germany, and a propaganda of the deed anarchist, who  became known for the failed assassination of the German Emperor, Wilhelm I. A former member of the Leipzig Social-Democratic Association, he was expelled from the organization in the 1870s and eventually became involved in anarchism.

Hödel used a revolver to shoot at the German Emperor, Wilhelm I, on 11 May 1878, while the 81-year-old and his daughter, Princess Louise of Prussia, paraded in their carriage. Hödel was seized immediately.  He was tried and convicted of high treason, and sentenced to death on 10 July by the Prussian State Court.  , Prussian state executioner, beheaded Hödel on 16 August 1878 in Moabit prison.

Although Hödel had been expelled from the Social Democratic Party, his actions, and those of Karl Nobiling, were used as justification to ban the party through the Anti-Socialist Law in October 1878.

See also 
Propaganda of the deed

References

External links

1857 births
1878 deaths
1878 crimes in Europe
Politicians from Leipzig
Executed anarchists
Failed regicides
People executed by Germany by decapitation
People executed by the German Empire
People executed for attempted murder
German anarchists
German revolutionaries
Executed people from Saxony
Criminals from Saxony
1878 in Germany